Himerois is a genus of moths of the family Noctuidae. The genus was described by Turner in 1902.

Species
 Himerois angustitaenia Warren, 1913
 Himerois basiscripta Warren, 1913
 Himerois periphaea Turner, 1920
 Himerois thiochroa Turner, 1902
 Himerois univittata Pagenstecher, 1900

References

Acontiinae